KXSL is a commercial music radio station in Show Low, Arizona, broadcasting on 1470 AM. It is owned by Ernie Barbee and Wanda Barbee, through licensee Casa Pinon, LLC.

External links

 
 
 Application for FCC construction permit

XSL
Mogollon Rim
White Mountains (Arizona)
Radio stations established in 1968
1968 establishments in Arizona